Richard Hofmann (8 February 1906 – 5 May 1983) was a German football player. He played in 25 internationals for Germany as a centre forward, scoring 24 goals, including the first ever international hat-trick against England by a player from outside the Home Nations.

Life and career 
He was born in Meerane, Saxony and began his career with the Meerane 07 club in 1922. In 1927 he was signed by English coach Jimmy Hogan for Dresdner SC, becoming known to fans as "König" ("King") Richard. He was known for his thunderous shots with either foot. He started his international career in 1927, scoring a hat-trick against Switzerland. At the 1928 Olympic Games in Amsterdam he was sent off in a match against Uruguay, and was suspended from internationals for a year.

In 1930, Hofmann lost his right ear in a car accident. This impaired his balance and had a serious impact on his career, later playing with protection over his ear. However, on 10 May 1930, playing for the German national team against England in Berlin, he scored a hat-trick in a 3–3 draw. He also scored hat-tricks for the national team against Sweden (1929), Denmark (1931) and Finland (1932). In all, he played 25 times for the national team, scoring 24 goals. He captained the German team in four matches, and earned his last cap against France in 1933. Later that year he was suspended from the national team for a "violation of his amateur status", after signing an advertising deal for a cigarette company. However, he continued to play with the Dresdner SC team until 1947, when he joined BSG Hainsberg and later Lok Stendal as a coach.

Hofmann died in 1983 in Freital, Saxony, then in East Germany. The main football stadium in Meerane is named Richard-Hofmann-Stadium in his honour.

Honours 
Dresdner SC
German Championship: 1943, 1944
German Cup: 1940, 1941
Mitteldeutsche Meisterschaft: 1929, 1930, 1931, 1933
Gauliga Sachsen: 1933–34, 1938–39, 1939–40, 1940–41, 1942–43, 1943–44

References

External links 

1906 births
1983 deaths
People from Meerane
People from the Kingdom of Saxony
Footballers at the 1928 Summer Olympics
German footballers
Germany international footballers
Olympic footballers of Germany
Dresdner SC players
Association football forwards
Footballers from Saxony